Paulo Henrique Costa (born 21 April 1991) is a Brazilian professional mixed martial artist. He currently competes in the Middleweight division in the Ultimate Fighting Championship (UFC). As of March 7, 2023, he is #5 in the UFC middleweight rankings.

Background
Costa, the son of odd-jobber Carlos Roberto and Maria Augusta, was born in 1991. He has an older brother, Carlos Costa, who is a former mixed martial artist and one of Paulo's coaches. Paulo grew up in Contagem playing football and eventually picking up Muay Thai at the age of nine in order to learn discipline and avoid street fights he was constantly getting into. As a teenager, Paulo joined a jiu-jitsu gym with his brother only to quit the sport after their father died of throat cancer when Paulo was 17. A couple of years later, Costa returned to jiu-jitsu and started competing under the tutelage of his brother who was already a purple belt at the time.

In order to help his mother with bills, Costa worked in real estate and as an IT teacher teaching Microsoft Word and Microsoft Excel.

Mixed martial arts career

Early career
Costa made his professional MMA debut in his native country of Brazil in February 2012. Eventually, his brother convinced their mother to support Paulo monetarily for a year in order to pursue his professional martial arts career. Over the next five years, he amassed a record of 8–0 with 7 knockouts and 1 submission.

The Ultimate Fighter: Brazil
Costa was chosen to be a fighter on The Ultimate Fighter: Brazil 3. In the opening elimination round, he defeated José Roberto via submission (guillotine choke) in the second round. Costa was the second middleweight fighter chosen by coach Wanderlei Silva. His next fight was against Márcio Alexandre Jr., and Costa lost via split decision after three rounds.

Ultimate Fighting Championship
Costa made his promotional debut on 11 March 2017, at UFC Fight Night 106 against Garreth McLellan. He won the fight via TKO in the first round, earning his first Performance of the Night award.

Costa faced Oluwale Bamgbose on 3 June 2017, at UFC 212. He won the fight via TKO in the second round.

After the fight with Bamgbose, UFC offered a new contract but the parties did not come to an agreement with the financial terms. The UFC then proposed a fight with former welterweight champion Johny Hendricks, with a promise to renegotiate after the bout. Costa faced Hendricks on 4 November 2017, at UFC 217. He won the fight via TKO in the second round. After the bout Costa signed a new, multi-fight contract.

Costa was expected to face Uriah Hall on 21 April 2018, at UFC Fight Night 128. However, Costa pulled out of the fight in mid-March with an arm injury. In turn, promotion officials elected to pull Hall from that event entirely and reschedule the pairing for 7 July 2018, at UFC 226. Costa won the fight via technical knockout in round two. The win earned him his second Performance of the Night award.

Costa was scheduled to face Yoel Romero on 3 November 2018, at UFC 230. However, Romero indicated in mid-August that, while he had been cleared to fight, his medics had recommended that he wait another four to five months to allow facial injuries incurred during his most recent fight to fully heal.

The bout was rescheduled again, and was expected to take place on 27 April 2019, at UFC on ESPN+ 8. Costa was removed from the card for an undisclosed reason. He was replaced by Ronaldo Souza. Romero then pulled out of the fight due to pneumonia, and Costa was scheduled to face Souza, but a United States Anti-Doping Agency (USADA) investigation prevented Costa from participating, so neither Romero nor Costa competed in the event.

It was revealed that Costa had been suspended for six months by USADA and Comissão Atlética Brasileira de MMA (CABMMA) for receiving prohibited intravenous infusions (IV) more than 100 mL in 12 hours after the weigh-ins in June 2017 at UFC 212 against Oluwale Bamgbose and November 2017 at UFC 217 against Johny Hendricks. Costa was fined a third of his purse of the fights, which were reverted to his opponents. The suspension was retroactive to 10 August 2018, and Costa was eligible to fight again in February 2019. On 23 March 2020, Lucas Penchel MSc, who provided the infusions in question, accepted a two-year ban from USADA, starting on 13 March 2020.

Costa finally faced Romero on 17 August 2019, at UFC 241. He won the fight via unanimous decision. This fight earned him the Fight of the Night award.

On the strength of his five fight win streak in the UFC, Costa faced Israel Adesanya for the UFC Middleweight Championship on 27 September 2020 at UFC 253.  He lost the fight via technical knockout in the second round, making this his first professional loss.

Post Title Shot
Costa was scheduled to face Robert Whittaker on 17 April 2021 at UFC on ESPN 22. However, on 16 March Costa withdrew from the fight due to illness.

Costa was scheduled to face Jared Cannonier on 21 August 2021 at UFC on ESPN 28. However, on 4 June, Costa withdrew from the bout due to unknown reasons. Costa later claimed he never signed the bout agreement and cited issues with his payment, while not confirming them as the reason for his withdrawal.

Costa faced Marvin Vettori in a light heavyweight bout on 23 October 2021 at UFC Fight Night 196, which was originally scheduled as a middleweight contest and briefly changed to a catchweight bout. Costa received widespread criticism for showing up twenty-five pounds over the middleweight limit.  Costa lost the fight via unanimous decision. In the post-fight press conference, UFC President Dana White said that Costa would no longer compete at Middleweight.

Costa was scheduled to face former UFC Middleweight Champion Luke Rockhold on July 30, 2022, at UFC 277. However, the bout was postponed to UFC 278 for unknown reasons. Costa won the fight via unanimous decision. The fight earned him the Fight of the Night award.

Costa was scheduled to face Robert Whittaker    on February 12, 2023, at UFC 284. However, Costa disputed the official announcement by the promotion indicating he had never signed a contract and the fight would not take place.

Championships and accomplishments
Jungle Fight
Middleweight Championship (One time)
One successful title defense
Ultimate Fighting Championship
Performance of the Night (Two times)  vs. Garreth McLellan and Uriah Hall 
Fight of the Night (Two times)  vs. Yoel Romero & Luke Rockhold  
MMAjunkie.com
2019 August Fight of the Month vs. Yoel Romero
Sherdog
2019 Round of the Year vs. Yoel Romero (round 1)

Controversies

Alleged assault on a nurse 
On May 31, 2022,  Costa was questioned by the police in the Metropolitan Region of Belo Horizonte, Brazil regarding an incident in which he allegedly assaulted a nurse with an elbow during a dispute over a COVID-19 vaccination card. Costa claims he was already vaccinated but had not had it recorded on his vaccination card, and that he asked the nurse to sign his card. The nurse, however, claims that Costa was not vaccinated and he refused the vaccination, and that he attempted to flee with the filled-out vaccination card without the shot being administered. She went on to say that in a measure to prevent him from leaving, she grabbed Costa by the arm and she was hit with an elbow, which caused her lips to become swollen. No charges were filed.

Racial slur controversy 
In response to a challenge put forth by former UFC fighter Mike Perry, Costa responded via Twitter with a tweet that said "This nigga really wants that smoke. Mike Platinum Black Perry. Wakanda". Costa came under fire from many fans for his use of the racial slur, and has since deleted the tweet, but posted a mock apology, and tweeted a picture of himself in photoshopped blackface.

Mixed martial arts record

|-
|Win
|align=center|14–2
|Luke Rockhold
|Decision (unanimous)
|UFC 278
|
|align=center|3
|align=center|5:00
|Salt Lake City, Utah, United States
|
|-
|Loss
|align=center|13–2
|Marvin Vettori
|Decision (unanimous)
|UFC Fight Night: Costa vs. Vettori 
|
|align=center|5
|align=center|5:00
|Las Vegas, Nevada, United States
|
|-
|Loss
|align=center|13–1
|Israel Adesanya
|TKO (punches and elbows) 
|UFC 253 
|
|align=center|2
|align=center|3:59
|Abu Dhabi, United Arab Emirates
|
|- 
|Win
|align=center|13–0
|Yoel Romero
|Decision (unanimous)
|UFC 241 
|
|align=center|3
|align=center|5:00
|Anaheim, California, United States
|
|-
|Win
|align=center|12–0
|Uriah Hall
|TKO (punches)
|UFC 226 
|
|align=center|2
|align=center|2:38
|Las Vegas, Nevada, United States
|
|-  
|Win
|align=center|11–0
|Johny Hendricks
|TKO (punches)
|UFC 217
|
|align=center|2
|align=center|1:23
|New York City, New York, United States
|
|-
|Win
|align=center|10–0
|Oluwale Bamgbose
|TKO (punches)
|UFC 212
|
|align=center|2
|align=center|1:06
|Rio de Janeiro, Brazil
|
|-
|Win
|align=center| 9–0
|Garreth McLellan
|TKO (punches)
|UFC Fight Night: Belfort vs. Gastelum
|
|align=center|1
|align=center|1:17
|Fortaleza, Brazil
|
|-
|Win
|align=center| 8–0
| Adriano Balby de Araujo
| KO (punch)
| Jungle Fight 90
|
|align=center|1
|align=center|3:25
| São Paulo, Brazil
|
|-
|Win
|align=center|7–0
|Eduardo Ramón
|Submission (rear-naked choke)
|Jungle Fight 87
|
|align=center|1
|align=center|2:40
|São Paulo, Brazil
|
|-
|Win
|align=center|6–0
|Bruno Assis
|TKO (punches)
|Jungle Fight 84
|
|align=center|1
|align=center|1:17
|São Paulo, Brazil
|
|-
|Win
|align=center|5–0
|Wagner Silva Gomes
|TKO (punches)
|FTF 11
|
|align=center|1
|align=center|4:37
|Rio de Janeiro, Brazil
|
|-
|Win
|align=center|4–0
|Gérson da Conceição
|TKO (doctor stoppage)
|FTF 9
|
|align=center|1
|align=center|5:00
|Rio de Janeiro, Brazil
|
|-
|Win
|align=center|3–0
|Fábio Moreira
|TKO (punches)
|BH Fight: MMA Grand Prix
|
|align=center|1
|align=center|1:26
|Belo Horizonte, Brazil
|
|-
|Win
|align=center|2–0
|Ademilson Borges 
|TKO (head kick and punches)
|Upper Fight: MMA Championship 2
|
|align=center|1
|align=center|0:32
|Teófilo Otoni, Brazil
|
|-
|Win
|align=center|1–0
|Téo Esteves
|TKO (head kick and punches)
|MMA Total Combat: Santa Luzia
|
|align=center|1
|align=center|2:08
|Santa Luzia, Brazil
|
|-

|-

|Loss
|align=center|1–1
|Márcio Alexandre Jr.
|Decision (split)
|rowspan=2|The Ultimate Fighter: Brazil 3
| (airdate)
|align=center|3
|align=center|5:00
|rowspan=2|São Paulo, Brazil
|
|-

|Win
|align=center|1–0
|José Roberto 
|Submission (guillotine choke)
| (airdate)
|align=center|2
|align=center|N/A
|
|-

Pay-per-view bouts

See also
 List of current UFC fighters
 List of male mixed martial artists

References

External links
  
 

1991 births
Living people
Brazilian male mixed martial artists
People from Belo Horizonte
People from Minas Gerais
Middleweight mixed martial artists
Mixed martial artists utilizing Muay Thai
Mixed martial artists utilizing Brazilian jiu-jitsu
Doping cases in mixed martial arts
Ultimate Fighting Championship male fighters
People awarded a black belt in Brazilian jiu-jitsu
Brazilian practitioners of Brazilian jiu-jitsu
Brazilian Muay Thai practitioners
Sportspeople from Belo Horizonte